Final Cut is a 2022 zombie comedy film directed by Michel Hazanavicius. It is a French remake of the 2017 Japanese film One Cut of the Dead. It stars Romain Duris and Bérénice Bejo. The film revolves around a crew remaking the film depicted in the original film. Yoshiko Takehara reprises her role as a producer.

The film was released in France on 17 May 2022, and for screening at the Cannes Film Festival as its opening film the same day.

Cast
 Romain Duris as Rémi
 Bérénice Bejo as Nadia
 Grégory Gadebois as Philippe
 Finnegan Oldfield as Raphaël
 Matilda Lutz as Ava
 Sébastien Chassagne as Armel
 Raphaël Quenard as Jonathan
 Lyes Salem as Mounir
 Simone Hazanavicius as Romy
 Agnès Hurstel as Laura
 Charlie Dupont as Fredo
 Luàna Bajrami as Johanna
 Raïka Hazanavicius as Manon
 Jean-Pascal Zadi as Fatih
 Yoshiko Takehara as Madame Matsuda

Production
Hazanavicius came on board the project during the first COVID-19 lockdown in 2020 after producer Vincent Maraval acquired the remake rights and approached him. Filming began on 19 April 2021 in Paris.

Release
The film was scheduled to premiere at the Sundance Film Festival in January 2022, but it was pulled from the festival after in-person screenings were cancelled in response to a surge in COVID-19 cases. It was subsequently announced that it would premiere at the 2022 Cannes Film Festival. Originally scheduled on 15 June 2022, the nationwide release in France was moved up to 17 May 2022, the same day as the festival premiere. In April 2022, the Ukrainian Institute urged the festival and Hazanavicius to rename the film's French title, as the letter Z had become a militaristic symbol in support of the Russian invasion of Ukraine. Hazanavicius at first said it was too late to change the title but he made sure that the film would be referred to exclusively by the international title, Final Cut, during the festival.

References

External links
 

2022 comedy films
French comedy films
2020s French-language films
French zombie films
Films about filmmaking
Films directed by Michel Hazanavicius
Films scored by Alexandre Desplat
Films shot in Paris
Remakes of Japanese films
One Cut of the Dead
Wild Bunch (company) films
Zombie comedy films
2020s French films